Adam Wilmot (born August 13, 1991) is an Australian professional wrestler better known by his ring name Adam Brooks. He is currently performing on the Australian independent circuit.

Professional wrestling career

Early career
Brooks began his career in his native Australia, becoming a perennial main eventer in the country.

Independent circuit
In the United States, he has wrestled for promotions including Ring of Honor, House of Hardcore and Pro Wrestling Guerilla. He has also wrestled in Europe for promotions including PROGRESS, Revolution Pro, Defiant Wrestling and OTT Wrestling and on the Mexican independent scene.

Personal life
Brooks is best friends with AEW wrestler Buddy Murphy, who was also his trainer.

Championships and accomplishments 
 Adelaide Championship Wrestling
 ACW Heavyweight Championship (1 time)
 Melbourne City Wrestling
 MCW Heavyweight Championship (1 time, current)
 MCW Tag Team Championship (3 times) - with Dowie James
 MCW Intercommonwealth Championship (4 times)
 Ballroom Brawl (2019)
 Fifth Triple Crown Champion
 Pro Wrestling Australia
 PWA Heavyweight Championship (1 time)
 Pro Wrestling Illustrated
 Ranked No. 147 of the top 500 singles wrestlers in the PWI 500 in 2018
 Riot City Wrestling
 RCW Championship (1 time)
RCW Emerald Crown (1 time, current, inaugural)
 C4 Absolute Grand Prix, inaugural (2021)
 Warzone Wrestling
 Warzone Heavyweight Championship (2 times)
 Outback Championship Wrestling
 OCW Tag Team Championship (1 time) - with KrackerJak

References

External links 
 
 

Living people
1991 births
Sportspeople from Melbourne
Sportsmen from Victoria (Australia)
Australian male professional wrestlers
Australian expatriate sportspeople in the United States
Expatriate professional wrestlers